Memories is a 2014 French comedy drama film directed by Jean-Paul Rouve.

Plot
While 23 years old nightporter Romain Esnart dreams about writing a great novel his father becomes a pensioner. Romain's father Michel doesn't like his new life and neither does his wife Nathalie like to have him around moping all the time. When Romain's 85 years old grandmother Madeleine runs away from a retirement home, the family friction is rocketing. Eventually Romain receives a postcard from Madeleine who visits Normandy. He borrows his father's car and joins her. As he learns she once attended a certain school when she was a little girl. Thanks to an understanding female young teacher she is allowed to get to know the pupils who are now as old as she was when she had to leave back then. Yet in the end it turns out that all this joy has been too exciting for her health. Time has come for Romain to say adieu.

Cast

 Annie Cordy as Madeleine Esnart
 Michel Blanc as Michel Esnart
 Mathieu Spinosi as Romain Esnart
 Chantal Lauby as Nathalie Esnart
 William Lebghil as Karim
 Flore Bonaventura as Louise
 Jean-Paul Rouve as Philippe
 Audrey Lamy as Director of the nursing home
 Xavier Briere as Pierre Esnart
 Yvan Garouel as Patrick Esnart
 Blanche Gardin as the tourist office clerk
 Arnaud Henriet as the cop
 Jacques Boudet as the painter
 Daniel Morin as the cashier
 Laurent Cléry as the receptionist
 Arthur Benzaquen as the yoga instructor
 Philippe Dusseau as the neighbour
 Zohra Benali as Karim's mother
 Jean-Michel Lahmi as Michel's boss

Production
The film premiered at the "Festival du film francophone d'Angoulême" on 23 August 2014. Annie Cordy and the entire crew received a standing-ovation at the end of the projection.

On 5 October 2014, the film was also screened at the Festival International du Film Francophone de Namur, where it was also praised by the audience. On 11 October 2014, the film was screened at the "Festival International du Film de Saint Jean de Luz".

Reception

The Hollywood Reporter'''s Jordan Mintzer judged Les Souvenirs as a "pleasant" film and described it as easygoing "family dramedy". 
A number of French celebrities including journalist Yves Bigot, and TV host Daniela Lumbroso  suggested on social media  Annie Cordy should be awarded a César Award for her performance as Madeleine''. Cordy went on to receive a nomination for Best Actress at the 6th Magritte Awards.

References

External links
 
 
 

French comedy-drama films
2014 comedy-drama films
2014 films
Films directed by Jean-Paul Rouve
2010s French films